Filatima karsholti is a moth of the family Gelechiidae. It is found in Mongolia and China.

References

Moths described in 1989
Filatima